Una is an unincorporated community in the counties of Darlington and Lee, South Carolina, United States.

References

Unincorporated communities in Darlington County, South Carolina
Unincorporated communities in Lee County, South Carolina
Unincorporated communities in South Carolina